Aaptos tentum is a species of sea sponge belonging to the family Suberitidae. The species was described in 1994 by Michelle Kelly-Borges and Patricia Bergquist.

References

Aaptos
Animals described in 1994
Taxa named by Patricia Bergquist